Michelle Hinnigan (born 12 June 1990) is an English former footballer who played as a midfielder for Everton. She has represented England on the under-17, under-19, under-20 and under 23 national teams.

Club career
Hinnigan joined Everton Ladies as a junior and progressed to the first team squad. Her real breakthrough came in the 2007–08 season when manager Mo Marley put Hinnigan in the first team after a number of injuries to then first-team regulars.

International career
Hinnigan has represented England at Under-17, Under-19, Under-20 and Under-23 levels. In July 2009, Hinnigan captained the England Under-19 side as they beat Sweden to win the European Championship.

Personal life
Hinnigan attends Loughborough University on the Talented Athlete Scholarship Scheme.
Michelle attended All Saints Catholic High School in Kirkby, Liverpool.

Honours

Everton
FA Women's Premier League Cup (1): 2007–08
FA Women's Cup (1): 2009–10

References

External links
 
 England player profile
 Everton player profile

Living people
1990 births
People from Kirkby
English women's footballers
Everton F.C. (women) players
FA Women's National League players
Alumni of Loughborough University
Women's Super League players
England women's under-23 international footballers
Women's association football midfielders
Universiade gold medalists for Great Britain
Universiade medalists in football
Medalists at the 2013 Summer Universiade